Miss Europe 1927, was the first ever edition Miss Europe pageant and the only edition under Fanamet, the European distributor of Paramount. It was first held at Sofiensaal in Vienna, Austria on February 5, 1927. After the original panel of 12 judges couldn't decide the winner, a "runoff" was held on March 15, 1927 in Berlin, Germany. The winner was chosen by Friedrich Wilhelm Murnau who then starred in a movie directed by him. Štefica Vidačić of Yugoslavia emerged victorious, and was crowned Miss Europe 1927 and the first ever Miss Europe.

Results

Placements

Contestants 

 - Hilde Ptak "Betty Bird"
   Baltic States - Margarete Klauss (Margit Klaus)
 - Zorka Jordanova (Sara Jordanova)
 - Ella Posnerová (Anna Posnerova)
 - Dina Sarri
 - Maria Mátyus
 - Aniela Bogucka
 - UNKNOWN
 - UNKNOWN
 Yugoslavia - Štefica Vidačić

References

External links 
 

Miss Europe
1927 in Europe
1927 beauty pageants
Beauty pageants in France
Beauty pageants in Austria
Beauty pageants in Germany